A proper complexity function is a function f mapping a natural number to a natural number such that:
 f is nondecreasing;
 there exists a k-string Turing machine M such that on any input of length n, M halts after O(n + f(n)) steps, uses O(f(n)) space, and outputs f(n) consecutive blanks.

If f and g are two proper complexity functions, then f + g, fg, and 2f are also proper complexity functions.

Similar notions include honest functions, space-constructible functions, and time-constructible functions.

References

Computational complexity theory